Flight 66 may refer to the following aviation accidents:
Eastern Air Lines Flight 66, crashed on 24 June 1975
Flying Tiger Line Flight 66, crashed on 19 February 1989
Carson Air Flight 66, crashed on 13 April 2015
Air France Flight 66, engine failure on 30 September 2017

066